The Amazonian antpitta (Hylopezus berlepschi) is a species of bird in the family Grallariidae. It is found in Bolivia, Brazil, and Peru. Its natural habitats are subtropical or tropical moist lowland forest and heavily degraded former forest.

References

Amazonian antpitta
Birds of the Amazon Basin
Birds of Bolivia
Birds of Peru
Amazonian antpitta
Amazonian antpitta
Taxonomy articles created by Polbot